The Ferrocarril del Sureste  (English: "Southeastern Railway"), commonly known by the syllabic abbreviation Ferrosur, is a railway that serves the southeastern regions of Mexico. The company was formed in 1998 following the privatization of Mexico's railways. Ferrosur won the concession to operate the southeastern railway. This includes the line between Mexico City and Mexico's busiest Gulf of Mexico/Atlantic Ocean port at Veracruz. Grupo México has owned the company since 2005 and there are long-delayed plans to merge it with the company's other railway, Ferromex.

History 
Ferrosur began operation on December 18, 1998. The original ownership group was the construction company Tribasa and Grupo Financiero Inbursa. Grupo Carso (like Inbursa, a Carlos Slim Helu company) bought out Tribasa in 1999. Grupo México, owner of Ferromex, acquired the railroad in November 2005 in a US$309 million stock transaction. The Mexican Federal Competition Commission (CFC) had rejected a proposed 2002 merger of Ferromex and Ferrosur amid opposition from Grupo Transportación Ferroviaria Mexicana (TFM).

Following the November 2005 purchase of Ferrosur by Grupo México, Kansas City Southern de México (KCSM), successor to TFM, petitioned the Mexican government to block the merger of Ferrosur and Ferromex. The CFC rejected the merger in June 2006 stating that the merger would have led to excessive concentration in the railroad industry to the detriment of consumers and competing shippers. However, in March 2011, a tribunal ruled in Grupo Mexico's favor, and the merger was permitted. Grupo México continues to operate the two railways independently.

Territory 

Ferrosur operates the ports of Veracruz and Coatzacoalcos and the line SC between Veracruz and Mexico City. This line has numerous tunnels east of Acultzingo including the longest in Mexico. Ferrosur road locomotives are often seen coated in soot from passing numerously times through these tunnels.

See also 
 List of Mexican railroads
 Rail transport in Mexico
 CG Railway, operates a train ferry connecting Ferrosur at the Port of Coatzacoalcos with Mobile, Alabama

Notes

References

External links 

 
 MEXLIST - The group for Mexican railway information

Sureste
Privatized companies in Mexico
Railway companies established in 1998
Standard gauge railways in Mexico